The men's hammer throw event at the 1980 Summer Olympics in Moscow, Soviet Union had an entry list of 17 competitors from 13 nations, with one qualifying group before the final (12) took place on 31 July 1980. Top 12 and ties and all those reaching 72.00 metres advanced to the final. The maximum number of athletes per nation had been set at 3 since the 1930 Olympic Congress. The event was won by Yuriy Sedykh of the Soviet Union, repeating as Olympic champion. He was the eighth man to win multiple medals in the event and third to have at least two gold medals (John Flanagan had three). Just as in 1976, Sedykh led the Soviet team to a medal sweep, with Sergey Litvinov taking silver and Jüri Tamm. The gold medal was the Soviet Union's third consecutive and fifth overall in the men's hammer throw, second all-time to the United States's seven.

Background

This was the 18th appearance of the event, which has been held at every Summer Olympics except 1896. Three of the 12 finalists from the 1976 Games returned: gold medalist Yuriy Sedykh of the Soviet Union, seventh-place finisher Chris Black of Great Britain, and twelfth-place finisher Peter Farmer of Australia. Sedykh was a heavy favorite to repeat. His teammates, Sergey Litvinov and Jüri Tamm, were his biggest challengers. The most significant absence due to the American-led boycott was Karl-Hans Riehm of West Germany, who had been undefeated in 1979.

Cuba and Kuwait each made their debut in the event. Great Britain appeared for the 15th time, most of any nation competing but behind the United States' 17 appearances (missing the event for the first time due to the boycott).

Competition format

The competition used the two-round format introduced in 1936, with the qualifying round completely separate from the divided final. In qualifying, each athlete received three attempts; those recording a mark of at least 72.00 metres advanced to the final. If fewer than 12 athletes achieved that distance, the top 12 would advance. The results of the qualifying round were then ignored. Finalists received three throws each, with the top eight competitors receiving an additional three attempts. The best distance among those six throws counted.

Records

Prior to the competition, the existing world and Olympic records were as follows.

Yuriy Sedykh broke his own Olympic record in the qualifying round, throwing the hammer 78.22 metres. In the very first throw of the final (Sedykh was the first athlete to throw), he broke the world record with 81.80 metres; this throw was not beaten during the competition. The top four athletes finished with better results than the old Olympic record.

Schedule

All times are Moscow Time (UTC+3)

Results

Qualifying

Final

Nine athletes received additional throws (rather than eight) because of a tie at 8th place through the first three throws.

See also

 1980 Hammer Throw Year Ranking
 1983 Men's World Championships Hammer Throw (Helsinki)

References

External links
  Official Report
  hammerthrow.wz

H
Hammer throw at the Olympics
Men's events at the 1980 Summer Olympics